Power Forward is a studio album by Wayman Tisdale released in 1995 on Motown Records. The album reached No. 4 on the Billboard Jazz Albums chart.

Tracklisting

References

1995 albums